Sebastián Edgardo Céspedes Reyes (born 18 April 1992) is a Chilean footballer who currently plays for Cobresal.

External links
 Sebastián Céspedes at Football-Lineups
 
 

1992 births
Living people
Chilean footballers
O'Higgins F.C. footballers
A.C. Barnechea footballers
Rangers de Talca footballers
Cobresal footballers
Chilean Primera División players
Association football midfielders
People from Rancagua